Oakwood Memorial Park, also known as the I.O.O.F. Cemetery, is a cemetery located at 3301 Paul Sweet Road in Santa Cruz, California, and was established in 1908. On site is the Oakwood Chapel. The Santa Cruz Memorial Park Cemetery, founded in 1862, and located at 1927 Ocean Street is connected now by the same management. 

The Oakwood Memorial Park location of this cemetery use to be part of Rancho Encinalitos, a Spanish land grant, which was later partitioned into Rancho Arroyoita which held Sacramenta Castro's adobe home. In 1908, a group of Protestant ministers from 12 local churches purchased the land. In 1956, the Odd Fellows Cemetery Association purchased the land.

Notable burials 

 William Vincent Lucas (1835–1921), Republican politician

See also 
 List of cemeteries in California

References 

1908 establishments in California
Cemeteries in Santa Cruz County, California